Azlocillin is an acyl ampicillin antibiotic with an extended spectrum of activity and greater in vitro potency than the carboxy penicillins.
Azlocillin is similar to mezlocillin and piperacillin. It demonstrates antibacterial activity against a broad spectrum of bacteria, including Pseudomonas aeruginosa and, in contrast to most cephalosporins, exhibits activity against enterococci.

Spectrum of bacterial susceptibility 
Azlocillin is considered a broad spectrum antibiotic and can be used against a number of Gram positive and Gram negative bacteria. The following represents MIC susceptibility data for a few medically significant organisms.
 Escherichia coli 1 μg/mL – 32 μg/mL
 Haemophilus spp. 0.03 μg/mL – 2 μg/mL
 Pseudomonas aeruginosa 4 μg/mL – 6.25 μg/mL

Synthesis 

An interesting alternative synthesis of azlocillin involves activation of the substituted phenylglycine analogue 1 with 1,3-dimethyl-2-chloro-1-imidazolinium chloride (2) and then condensation with 6-APA.

See also 
 Methicillin

References 

Penicillins
Enantiopure drugs
Imidazolidinones